Wang Liqiang, or William Wang, is a Chinese defector to Australia and self-proclaimed former spy. In November 2019, Wang sought political asylum in Australia, claiming to be a spy who was involved in the People's Republic of China's intervention in the affairs of Hong Kong SAR and Taiwan. The factual accuracy of his claims is disputed, and some experts suggested he may not be more than a low-level operative. China has claimed that Wang's allegations were "absurd" and that Wang is a "fraud". Wang's case drew worldwide attention, leading to an investigation in Taiwan.

In November 2021, Wang's main assertions regarding his involvement in building a "spy network" in Taiwan were discredited after Taiwan authority announced years-long investigation found no evidence to support the existence of such network or activity, and individuals that Wang accused as his associates or spy handlers were cleared of all national security charges due to "a lack of evidence".

In January 2023, Wang became both barred from living in Australia and his asylum visa application being rejected, after an Australian tribunal ruling found him guilty of having committed "serious fraud against an Australian citizen". The tribunal also expressed strong doubts of Wang's espionage claims and questioned how it could be safe to believe in them, given his past fraudulent activities.

Investigation
Shanghai police stated that Wang is a convicted fraudster who left mainland China for Hong Kong on bogus travel documents. Online court records appear to confirm he had received a suspended sentence of 18 months from a Fujian court in October 2016. Wang has denied these allegations. The factual accuracy of these claims (of fraud) are disputed by Wang, because, according to ASPI's strategic analyst Alex Joske who participated in 60 Minutes's investigation of Wang, Wang claimed he obtained a police check which was clear of any such convictions when he applied for Australian visa.

Wang claims that he was involved in the PRC government's operation to support pro-Beijing media outlets in Taiwan and candidates in the 2018 Taiwanese local elections, with the ultimate goal to prevent incumbent ROC President Tsai Ing-wen's re-election in 2020. Wang also claimed to be involved in the abductions of the Causeway Bay Books booksellers in Hong Kong, although Lam Wing-kee, one of the abductees, does not recall meeting him and has reservations about his claims. Lam Wing Kee told Hong Kong media that Wang was likely just repeating details of the abduction that he had “heard elsewhere,” dismissing his claim to have played any central role in the operation.

 
Leonid Petrov, a Korean security expert at the Australian National University, also said the South Korean passport contained serious discrepancies. And questioned why would the Chinese intelligence ever equip their spies with crude forgeries? Petrov points out that 'Wang' is a very common Chinese name but a very rare name in Korea. And that picking an unusual name for a South Korean citizen's passport would had only attracted unwanted attention to the passport bearer. Additionally Petrov points out an obvious error that the Korean name on the passport in the lower right area doesn't match the English name listed. Lastly he pointed out that Wang does not speak Korean, hence the issuance and use of this fake passport for anything other than just “flash” purposes was unprofessional for intelligence operations as carrying a passport in a language one does not speak is extremely risky.

Sky News host Sharri Markson reported in the Daily Telegraph that Wang may have only been engaged in low-level work for the Chinese. The Daily Telegraph had also reported that Australian intelligence officials had briefed the Australian Prime Minister Scott Morrison on a report witheringly titled “China Spy Farce”, with the consensus that it is “highly dubious” that Wang Liqiang was the high-level Chinese spy that he claims to be, and while Wang may have been involved in “very low-level” work, he did not operate in Australia and would “not have value” to the country. 

Wang also claimed that he worked with the Hong Kong-based company China Innovation Investment Limited to infiltrate Hong Kong universities and media with pro-Chinese Communist Party operatives. On 26 November, Taiwanese authorities detained and questioned Chinese businessman Xiang Xin (向心, also Xiang Nianxin 向念心) and his wife Gong Qing (龔青), executives of China Innovation whom Wang identified as Chinese intelligence operatives. The two denied knowing Wang. The two were accused of running a spy network directed by high-level members of the People's Liberation Army, Nie Li and Ding Henggao.

On 8 April 2021, Xiang and Gong were charged with illegally laundering around US$24 million from Shanghai-based Guotai Investment Holding Group (國太投資), with an investigation regarding whether the two violated the National Security Act ongoing.  The prosecutors alleged that Xiang held positions at various Chinese state corporations related to the military, while Gong worked as an art editor for a military affairs magazine.

However, on 12 November 2021, Taiwan's Taipei Prosecutors Office said it has dropped all national security related charges against Xiang Xin and five other alleged associates citing "a lack of evidence". The prosecutors said they could not find any evidence to back Wang Liqiang's assertions that the businesses invested by Xiang Xin ever engaged in election interference or information operations in Taiwan. There was also little evidence to support Wang's assertion that Xiang Xin ran a spy network supported by China, as Wang asserted in 2019.

Reactions

Australia 
Australian Prime Minister Scott Morrison described allegations of a Chinese plot to infiltrate Australia's parliament as "deeply disturbing". "I would caution anyone leaping to any conclusions about these matters. And that's why we have these agencies." On 24 November 2019, the Australian Security Intelligence Organisation (ASIO) confirmed that Wang's allegations were being taken "seriously", but did not comment on the merits thereof.

Labor leader Anthony Albanese said the reports were "of real concern", and that Wang might have a "legitimate claim for asylum". Liberal member-of-parliament Andrew Hastie called Wang a "friend of democracy", and also called for the government to grant Wang's asylum application.

James Laurenceson, acting director of the Australia-China Relations Institute at the University of Technology Sydney criticised the Australian media for pushing the Wang story too hastily without having it verified first . He stated “It is a fact that Australian journalists, commentators and politicians more hawkish on China and more invested in the ‘China threat’ narrative were the ones breaking the Wang Liqiang story and talking it up. The Wang Liqiang story is just the latest example of claims running ahead of an evidence base in Australia.”

Speaking on national television, Australian Treasurer Josh Frydenberg declined to comment on ASIO's "operational matter," but said that the Australian government "makes no apologies for the laws that [it's] introduced around foreign interference and foreign influence."

Mainland China 
Ma Xiaoguang, leader of the Taiwan Affairs Office of the Chinese State Council, said that "the mainland never involves itself in Taiwanese elections, and these reports are complete nonsense." He further stated that whoever "made up" this story intends to meddle with the Taiwanese election unjustly and that he believed "Taiwanese compatriots will see this right through."

The Jing'an Branch of the Shanghai Public Security Bureau issued an official statement that Wang was a fugitive in a fraud case and that both his Chinese passport and Hong Kong permanent resident identity card were forged. On 27 November, Chinese state-owned Global Times released an "exclusive" court video apparently showing Wang on trial for fraud, admitting all charges, and given a suspended sentence of 18 months. However, some critics argued that the video is likely doctored, because it appears "blurry" and "heavily edited," and features mostly the back of the subject.

Taiwan 

Han Kuo-yu, the Kuomintang presidential candidate rejected claims of electoral assistance from the CCP and said that if he had taken even a single dollar from them for the campaign, he would withdraw immediately. President Tsai responded that China obviously intends to interfere with Taiwanese elections.

Wong Yen-ching, former deputy director of Taiwan's Military Intelligence Bureau, stated that he suspected Wang of fraud and that based on his professional judgement, he can say with certainty that [Wang's allegations] were falsified in an attempt to seek political asylum.” According to him, Wang's claim that he worked in both Taiwan and Hong Kong, and that he reported to two supervisors at the same time contradicts the basic principles of espionage as spies assigned tasks in one location at a time, will not report to multiple supervisors simultaneously. In addition, Wong says that Wang referred to China’s intelligence bureau by a former name,  appearing to have no knowledge that it was later renamed. Wong asserts "If Wang had valuable information to provide, the Australian government would protect the information by attempting to prevent him from giving interviews. As Canberra apparently does not trust him, Wang must have spoken to the media in an attempt to avoid being deported back to China".

See also 
 2019 Australian Parliament infiltration plot
 Australia-China relations
 Cross-Strait relations

References

Chinese defectors
Living people
Cross-Strait relations
Australia–China relations
November 2019 events in Australia
Right of asylum in Australia
Chinese spies
Year of birth missing (living people)
Impostors